Turuncha River is a Bolivian river in the Potosí Department, Agustín Municipality (which is identical to the Enrique Baldivieso Province), San Agustín Canton. It flows along the little town San Agustín, the capital of the province.

See also 
 List of rivers of Bolivia

References

Rivers of Potosí Department